Anawin Jujeen (born March 13, 1987) is a Thai professional footballer who plays as a right back. He was the runner-up of Pepsi World Challenge 2006 with Wisoot Bunpeng.

He played for Krung Thai Bank FC in the 2008 AFC Champions League group stages.

Club career

Anawin played for Krung Thai Bank FC until the club changed to Bangkok Glass FC. He was a regular starter in Bangkok Glass FC, playing as an attacking midfielder or a right midfielder.
In 2013, he moved to Buriram United FC for an undisclosed fee. Transfer fee believe around ฿ 2.5 to 5 million. He normally plays as a right back and sometimes as a right midfielder in Buriram United.

Anawin played in the 2013 AFC Champions League. He was a starter for playing for Buriram in the 2013 AFC Champions League against Vegalta Sendai, FC Seoul. He came in as a substitute against Jiangsu Sainty and received a red card after getting two yellow cards in the game. After advancing to the knockout phase Anawin scored a header against Bunyodkor at Buriram. He came in as a substitute for the remaining  games against Bunyodkor and Esteghlal.

International career

On December 4, 2009, Anawin debuted for Thailand U23 at the 2009 Southeast Asian Games at Laos against Vietnam U23. He also scored his first and second goal for Thailand U23 against Timor-Leste U23 at the 2009 Southeast Asian Games. Anawin played for Thailand U23 in the 2010 Asian Games at Guangzhou, China, and scored a goal against Pakistan U23.

In 2014, he was called up to the national team by Kiatisuk Senamuang to play in the 2015 AFC Asian Cup qualification.

International

International goals

under-23

Honours

Clubs
Bangkok Glass
 Queen's Cup: 2010
 Singapore Cup: 2010

Buriram United
 Thai Premier League: 2013, 2014, 2015
 Thai FA Cup: 2013, 2015
 Thai League Cup: 2013, 2015 
 Toyota Premier Cup: 2014, 2016
 Kor Royal Cup: 2013, 2014, 2015, 2016
 Mekong Club Championship: 2015, 2016

Dragon Pathumwan Kanchanaburi
Thai League 3 Western Region: 2022–23

References

External links
 Profile at Goal
https://ie.soccerway.com/players/anawin-jujeen/26556/

1987 births
Living people
Anawin Jujeen
Anawin Jujeen
Association football defenders
Association football wingers
Anawin Jujeen
Anawin Jujeen
Anawin Jujeen
Anawin Jujeen
Anawin Jujeen
Footballers at the 2010 Asian Games
Anawin Jujeen
Thai expatriate sportspeople in Malaysia